Janoschs Traumstunde is a West German animated children's television series that originally aired from 1986 to 1990. It was based on the works of German artist and children's book author Janosch, with directors Jürgen Egenolf, Uwe-Peter Jeske and Wolfgang Urchs.

Format

Almost every episode contains two self-contained stories; in some cases, episodes featured three to four shorter stories. The stories are framed by a series of sequences featuring the "Big, Fat, Fabulous Bear," who introduced the stories in each episode.

Broadcast and home media release

In Germany, the first season aired from October 12, 1986, to January 4, 1987, and the second season between January 7 and April 2, 1990, both airing on ARD. Re-runs later aired on KiKa from April 8, 2007, until April 5, 2008. In the United Kingdom, it was broadcast as The Bear, The Tiger and the Others on CBBC in the 1980s.

In the United States, the series (dubbed in English and released under the title Janosch) was distributed on VHS by Celebrity Home Entertainment's "Just for Kids" imprint; it briefly aired on Nickelodeon's Nick Jr. block as Janosch's Dream World (a direct translation of the original German title) from 1993 to 1994.

See also
List of German television series

References

External links
 
 Official YouTube channel.

German children's animated television series
Television shows based on children's books
1980s animated television series
1986 German television series debuts
1990 German television series endings
German-language television shows
Das Erste original programming